"Lolita (trop jeune pour aimer)" (meaning "Lolita (Too Young to Love)") is the third single from Celine Dion's album Incognito, released on 21 September 1987 in Quebec, Canada. The song was composed and produced by Jean Roussel and the lyrics were written by Luc Plamondon.

Background
The song references Lolita by Vladimir Nabokov and the lyrics describe a young woman who insists that she is not "too young" for love. According to Dion, "When I saw what Luc had written, I was bowled over. Like Eddy, Luc had explored my inner life. What he had written was so close to me that I couldn't help being really unsettled by it". Dion said the song described her love for her manager and future husband René Angélil, "The first time I sang the words to 'Lolita,' I was in front of René, and I sang it to arouse him".

The single was released with "Ma chambre" as B-side. "Lolita (trop jeune pour aimer)" was very successful reaching number 1 in Quebec for two weeks. It entered the chart on 3 October 1987 and spent twenty two weeks on it.

An early music video was made for the Incognito TV special aired in September 1987, produced by Canadian Broadcasting Corporation and directed by Jacques Payette. Later, a second commercial music video was filmed in Scotland also directed by Jacques Payette in 1987. It features Dion walking around Edinburgh and taking the bus. According to Dion's publicist at the time, Mia Dumont, the video stunned her fans, as it marked her transition from child star to adult artist. "All of a sudden she had this body," Dumont said. "These legs from here to there. And she was beautiful. People could see that she was beautiful". This video can be found on Dion's DVD called On ne change pas.

The song was later included on the 2005 greatest hits album On ne change pas.

Track listings and formats
Canadian 7" single
"Lolita (trop jeune pour aimer)" – 3:59
"Ma chambre" – 4:00

Charts

References

External links

Songs about teenagers
1980s ballads
1987 singles
1987 songs
CBS Records singles
Celine Dion songs
French-language songs
Music based on novels
Pop ballads
Sexuality and age in fiction
Songs with lyrics by Luc Plamondon